Kim Do-kyun (born 13 January 1977) is a South Korean football manager and former player. He played for South Korea in 1997 FIFA World Youth Championship, 2000 Summer Olympics and 2000 CONCACAF Gold Cup.

Career statistics

Club

Honours
Ulsan Hyundai Horang-i
Korean League Cup runner-up: 2002

Jeonnam Dragons
Korean FA Cup: 2006

South Korea U20
AFC Youth Championship: 1996

Individual
AFC Youth Championship Most Valuable Player: 1996
AFC Asian All Stars: 1999

Notes

References

External links 
 
 Kim Do-kyun at KFA 
 FIFA Player Statistics
 
 

1977 births
Living people
Association football midfielders
South Korean footballers
South Korean expatriate footballers
South Korea international footballers
Ulsan Hyundai FC players
Kyoto Sanga FC players
Seongnam FC players
Jeonnam Dragons players
K League 1 players
J2 League players
Expatriate footballers in Japan
2000 CONCACAF Gold Cup players
Footballers at the 2000 Summer Olympics
Olympic footballers of South Korea
South Korean expatriate sportspeople in Japan
Sportspeople from North Gyeongsang Province